Walsoken railway station was located on the line between  and . It served the village and parish of Walsoken in Norfolk, England, and closed in 1851. Today there is no trace of the station or the railway as the site has been redeveloped with housing.

References

Former Great Eastern Railway stations
Railway stations in Great Britain opened in 1848
Railway stations in Great Britain closed in 1851
Disused railway stations in Norfolk